Italy competed at the 1969 European Athletics Championships in Athens, Greece, from 16 to 21 September 1969.

Medalists

Top eight

Men

Women

See also
 Italy national athletics team

References

External links
 EAA official site

Italy at the European Athletics Championships
Nations at the 1969 European Athletics Championships
1969 in Italian sport